Longidorus is a genus of needle nematodes. Some of its species are plant pests.

They may also transmit important plant viruses such as the potato virus U or the cacao necrosis virus.

Species are known to infest narcissus, alfalfa, beet, caneberries, lettuce, grape and citruses

References

Bibliography 

Enoplea genera
Longidoridae
Grape pest nematodes